Granny is a 2003 Russian drama film directed by Lidia Bobrova.

Plot 
The plot focuses on a grandmother whose grandchildren grew up and started a family. She sells her house, and gives the money to her grandchildren, having left to live with her daughter and son-in-law in the city apartment that they received. It would seem that she lives a calm life, but suddenly a disaster occurred.

Cast 
 Nina Shubina as Granny
 Olga Onishchenko as Liza
 Anna Ovsyannikova as Anna
 Vladimir Kulakov as Viktor
 Sergey Anufriev as Nikolay
 Yuriy Ovsyanko as Ivan
 Valentina Cherkozyanova as Valentina
 Mariya Lobachova as Taya
 Sergey Gamov as Tolik
 Tamara Tsyganova as Masha

References

External links 
 

2003 films
2000s Russian-language films
Russian drama films
French drama films
2003 drama films
2000s French films